is a 3D arcade fighting game and the second latest in the series of Gundam VS video game series developed and published by Namco Bandai Games prior to Gundam Versus which is on PS4 (released June 6, 2017 in japan & asia territories then on September 17, 2017 worldwide). Extreme Vs. is the sequel to Mobile Suit Gundam: Gundam vs. Gundam NEXT. The game was first unveiled at the AOU 2010 and released on September 28, 2010. The game was later released on the PlayStation 3 on December 1, 2011, featuring balance tweaks.

The game's theme song is titled "The Catalyst", performed by Linkin Park. Bandai and the band also cooperated in the development of a special limited edition HGUC 1/144 RX-78GP01-Fb Gundam Zephyranthes Full Vernian model kit molded in colors and including detail stickers inspired by the cover art for A Thousand Suns.

An update, Mobile Suit Gundam: Extreme Vs. Full Boost (機動戦士ガンダム エクストリームバーサス フルブースト), was released in arcades on April 5, 2012. The update includes 74 mobile suits with new units added monthly via network. The theme song for Full Boost is titled "Fight It Out (Pay Money to my Pain)" (feat. K), performed by both Akihiro Namba of Hi-Standard and Takeshi Ueda of AA=. Full Boost later released on the PlayStation 3 adding more mobile suits than the arcade version as downloadable content.

Another update, Mobile Suit Gundam: Extreme Vs. Maxi Boost (機動戦士ガンダム エクストリームバーサス マキシブースト), was released in arcades on March 6, 2014. This update introduced both new suits and characters as well as new game mechanics such as a revamped EX Mode and changes to forms for certain units. The theme song for Maxi Boost is titled "Rave-up Tonight", performed by Fear, and Loathing in Las Vegas.

A further update, Mobile Suit Gundam: Extreme Vs. Maxi Boost ON (機動戦士ガンダム エクストリームバーサス マキシブースト ON), was released in arcades on March 9, 2016. This update provided online matching system for the arcade and introduced even more mobile suits and characters along with balance changes. The theme song for Maxi Boost ON is titled "No Future", performed by SiM. In January 2020 it was announced that Maxi Boost ON would be released worldwide on July 30, 2020 to the PlayStation 4. The PlayStation 4 version includes a few new mobile suits not available in the arcade version.

A sequel, Mobile Suit Gundam: Extreme Vs. 2 (機動戦士ガンダム エクストリームバーサス 2), was released on the Namco System ES3 in arcades on October 30, 2018. The game introduced both newer suits and characters and had HD definition screen on the arcade. The theme song for 2 is titled "Revolution", performed by Coldrain.

An update to Extreme Vs. 2, Mobile Suit Gundam Extreme Vs. 2 XBoost (機動戦士ガンダム エクストリームバーサス２ クロスブースト), was release in arcades on March 10, 2021. The game marks the 10th anniversary of the Extreme Vs. series, and includes new suits and battle systems. The theme song for XBoost is titled "RedZone", performed by Crossfaith.

Gameplay
Extreme Vs. retains the trademark gameplay of previous installments of the Gundam Vs. series, with a few adjustments and changes.  During a standard arcade battle, each team is given a resource meter of 6000 points; when a mobile suit is shot down, its cost is deducted from the meter, and the first team to hit 0 loses.  Each mobile suit costs 3000, 2500, 2000, or 1000 points, with higher cost machines being more powerful while cheaper machines are much weaker.  A few missions, particularly boss battles, eschew this in favor of making a single machine the target and having its defeat be the goal of the stage (the player's side still has a resource meter and will lose as normal if it is depleted).

Mobile Suit Gundam Extreme VS Maxi Boost has major changes since its update from Full Boost, the previous version; all 1000 points units are up 500 each, so it is 1500 points in total. The 1000-cost mobile units' HP, and other ammos are now up since it has added by 500 points, so the weapons are also up and they're now par with 2000 cost mobile suits in terms of skill speed (e.g. Gundam 00 Colasour GNX-III's [Note: Normal/Powered] cost 1000 -> 1500, HP 330 -> 480, main ammo [A] 40/60 -> 60/90, sub [ab] 3/6 -> 6/9, and enough mobility).

Gameplay makes use of four primary buttons: Shoot, Melee, Jump, and Search. There are also three sub-commands used by pressing Shoot and Melee (Sub-Weapon), Shoot and Jump (Special Shooting) and Melee and Jump (Special Melee). In addition to these, machines can have two different charge attacks, activated by holding the Shoot or Melee button until a meter on the ammunition display fills.

Extreme Vs. adds in two important gameplay changes. Extreme Action is the ability to dash-cancel one's attacks, allowing the player to string together larger and more damaging combos.  Extreme Burst is a super mode, similar to older games' Awakenings, activated by pressing Shoot, Melee, and Jump together when a meter at the bottom of the screen is filled.  All playable machines also have a super-powerful Burst Attack, executed by pressing Shoot, Melee, and Jump together while Extreme Burst is active.  Full Boost will give Burst Attacks to every mobile suit in the game.

The PlayStation 3 release adds Trial Mission Mode, which features a series of specific challenges that go outside the normal conditions of the game, such as destroying a set number of machines within a time limit or sinking a battleship such as the Argama or Archangel. Trial Mission Mode features a number of enemy-exclusive mobile suits from all the included series, as well as a number of new boss characters.

Reception

In Japan, the game reached #1 in the sales charts.

References

External links
  

2010 video games
Arcade video games
Bandai Namco games
Fighting games
Gundam video games
Japan-exclusive video games
PlayStation 3 games
Video games developed in Japan